William A. Burgett (June 30, 1932April 10, 1999) served as acting Michigan Auditor General in 1961.

Early life and education
Burgett was born on June 30, 1932, in Des Moines, Iowa. In 1956, Burgett earned a B.A. from the University of Iowa. Burgett later attended Michigan State University in 1957 and 1958.

Career
Burgett served in the United States Army from 1952 to 1954. At some point, Burgett served as the administrative assistant to Michigan Lieutenant Governor John B. Swainson and as the assistant to the chairman of the Michigan Democratic Party. Burgett was appointed Deputy Michigan Auditor General on June 21, 1960. On October 9, 1961, Michigan Auditor General Otis M. Smith resigned. Burgett was appointed acting state auditor general the following day. Billie S. Farnum was appointed and qualified as his successor on October 23, 1961.

Personal life
Burgett was married to Betsy Bartley. Burgett was Methodist.

Death
Burgett died on April 10, 1999.

References

1932 births
1999 deaths
United States Army soldiers
University of Iowa alumni
Michigan State University alumni
Michigan Auditors General
Politicians from Des Moines, Iowa
20th-century American politicians